Ibtisam Ismai'l al-Samadi (born 1955) is a Syrian poet and academic. She was born in Jasim in Daraa and studied elementary and middle school in Beirut and then moved to Syria to complete her studies. She graduated from Damascus University in English and returned to Beirut to complete her postgraduate studies. Started writing at a young age. She is one of the academies of Damascus University in the Department of Arts and English.Involved into politics and became a member of the Syrian People's Assembly. Her poetry books are printed and she is the owner of Tuesday (Al-Thulatha') Cultural Salon.

Works 
Printed poetry collections including:

 Ambassador Extraordinary: 1990.
 She and me and other affairs: 1995.
 Diamond grains
 Diamond for him: 2002.
 Full Jasmine 2005.
 Sense of Sham: 2017.
 The Nile is like her: a collection of unprinted articles.
 Come Fly Range: Her poetry collection for children.

References 

Syrian salon-holders
Syrian women poets
Syrian people of Lebanese descent
Damascus University alumni
Academic staff of Damascus University
Members of the People's Assembly of Syria
All stub articles
1955 births
20th-century Syrian poets
21st-century Syrian poets
Children's poets
People from Izra District
Syrian emigrants to Lebanon
Living people